was a Japanese politician of the Democratic Party of Japan, a member of the House of Councillors in the Diet (national legislature). A native of Toshima, Tokyo and dropout of Saitama University, he had served in the city assembly of Kawagoe, Saitama for four terms since 1979 and then in the assembly of Saitama Prefecture for two terms since 1995, both from Democratic Socialist Party. In 2001, he was elected to the House of Councillors for the first time.

References

External links 
  in Japanese.

1948 births
2022 deaths
20th-century Japanese politicians
21st-century Japanese politicians
Members of the House of Councillors (Japan)
Democratic Party of Japan politicians
Democratic Socialist Party (Japan) politicians
Members of the Saitama Prefectural Assembly
Saitama University alumni
People from Toshima